An Allegory of Truth and Time is a 1584–85 oil on canvas painting by Annibale Carracci, now on display in Hampton Court as part of the Royal Collection.

It is not mentioned in any of the 17th century biographical sources on Carracci's life and it is thought to have been in England by the early 18th century at the latest. The first definite reference to it dates to the mid 19th century, by which time it was in Queen Victoria's collection and thought to be by an unknown artist. Roberto Longhi and Hermann Voss assigned it its present attribution in the early 20th century.

Its style is very close to that of the artist's work on the Lives of Jason and Medea frescoes at the Palazzo Fava in Bologna, produced around 1584 with his relations Agostino Carracci and Ludovico Carracci. For this reason it is sometimes argued that the canvas was commissioned by that palazzo's owner, Filippo Fava. Its style and composition are both close to a drawing for a Judgement of Paris (Fogg Art Museum), argued by some art historians to have been produced by Carracci as a preparatory for a lost or never-executed painting.

Iconography

Influences
One of the masterpieces of the painter's youth, it reflects his reaction to Correggio's style, a reaction which marked his paintings immediately after entering the art scene. Some argue that in this work that reaction is also filtered through the work of Federico Barocci.

Gallery

References

1585 paintings
Paintings by Annibale Carracci
Paintings in the Royal Collection of the United Kingdom
16th-century allegorical paintings
Allegorical paintings by Italian artists